Jack Mahon(e)y may refer to:

Jack Mahoney (composer) on Blue Feather
 Jock Mahoney or Jacques Mahoney, actor
Jack Mahony in 2010 AFL Draft
Jack Mahoney (ethicist) (born 1931), Scottish Jesuit and moral theologian
Jack Mahoney, the alter ego of the superhero who is known as The Moth

See also
John Mahoney (disambiguation)